Ali ibn al-Husayn ibn Ali ibn Hanzala was the tenth Tayyibi Isma'ili Dāʿī al-Muṭlaq in Yemen, from 1284 to his death in 1287. 

He was the son of al-Husayn, the maʾdhūn (senior deputy) to his predecessor, the ninth Dāʿī, also named Ali ibn al-Husayn, and grandson of the sixth Dāʿī, Ali ibn Hanzala. Ali and his grandfather belonged to the Banu Hamdan and were the only ones to break the monopoly of the Qurayshi Ibn al-Walid family on the office of Dāʿī al-Muṭlaq during the 13th century. He was succeeded by another Ibn al-Walid, Ibrahim ibn al-Husayn.

References

Sources
 

Year of birth unknown
1287 deaths
Banu Hamdan
Tayyibi da'is
13th century in Yemen

13th-century Arabs
13th-century Ismailis
13th-century Islamic religious leaders